The Toronto Marlies are a professional ice hockey team based in Toronto. They compete in the American Hockey League (AHL) as a member of the North Division of the Eastern Conference. The Marlies is owned by Maple Leafs Sports & Entertainment, a company that owns several professional sports teams in the city, including their NHL affiliate, the Toronto Maple Leafs. The Marlies have played their home games at Coca-Cola Coliseum since 2005.

The Marlies was established as the New Brunswick Hawks in 1978. The team relocated three times, to St. Catharines, Newmarket, and St. John's, before relocating to Toronto in 2005. As a part of its relocation to Toronto, the team was renamed the Marlies, after the Toronto Marlboros, a junior hockey team formerly sponsored by the Maple Leafs. The Marlies have advanced to the Calder Cup Finals in 2012 and 2018, with the Marlies having won the latter series.

History
The Marlies trace their history back to the New Brunswick Hawks, which were founded in 1978 and jointly operated by the Maple Leafs and Chicago Black Hawks as a farm team.  Maple Leaf Gardens Limited (MLGL) and the Black Hawks each owned half of the franchise.

The Hawks played until 1982 when they relocated to St. Catharines, Ontario as the St. Catharines Saints, this time as a sole Leafs affiliate; the Hawks had opted to affiliate with the Springfield Indians. After four seasons, the team moved to Newmarket, Ontario as the Newmarket Saints, where they played for five seasons before moving to St. John's, Newfoundland and Labrador as the St. John's Maple Leafs, the first professional ice hockey team in Newfoundland and Labrador. The team played their home games at Memorial Stadium until 2001, when they moved to Mile One Centre.

The AHL had a strong presence in Atlantic Canada in the 1980s and 1990s. However, after the turn of the millennium, NHL teams sought to have their AHL affiliates located geographically closer to their parent clubs in order to ease the movement of players between the minors and the NHL. By 2004, St. John's was the only remaining team in the region. Although the team was extremely popular and had excellent attendance, the parent Maple Leafs wanted to cut back on escalating travel costs. Additionally, Ricoh Coliseum (formerly CNE Coliseum and now Coca-Cola Coliseum had recently been renovated for hockey use, and the NHL Leafs were looking to place a team there. The Coliseum had been home to the Toronto Roadrunners, top affiliate of the Edmonton Oilers, in the 2003–04 season. These factors resulted in the team's relocation to Toronto for the 2005–06 season.

The team is named after the former Toronto Marlboros, a junior hockey team that played in Toronto from 1904 to 1989, the last 62 years of that time under common ownership with the Leafs. The team was long known as the "Marlies" to fans and media alike. To avoid any potential association with the similarly named cigarette brand, MLSE uses the abbreviated form as the team's official nickname.

The Rochester Americans have succeeded the now defunct Hamilton Bulldogs as the major rival of the Marlies, whose parent team, the Maple Leafs, also have a rivalry with the Americans' parent club, the Buffalo Sabres.

During the 2011–12 AHL season, the Marlies advanced to the Calder Cup Finals, the deepest playoff run for a Toronto-based team since the Leafs won the Stanley Cup in 1967. They lost to the Norfolk Admirals in a four-game sweep.

In 2015–16 season, the Marlies moved from the Western Conference to the Eastern Conference due to the relocation of five teams to California.

During the 2017–18 AHL season, the Marlies won their first Calder Cup after a 4–3 series win over the Texas Stars in the finals. It was the first professional hockey title for a Toronto-based team since 1967.

On December 1, 2019, Greg Moore was named as head coach of the Marlies, replacing Sheldon Keefe who was promoted to head coach of the Maple Leafs.

Team information

Logo

The Toronto Marlies' primary colours are blue and white, which is used in the team's logo. The present logo for the Marlies, introduced in 2016, is based on the Toronto Marlboros' logo. The Marlboros were a junior ice hockey team that was formerly sponsored by Maple Leaf Gardens Limited.

Broadcast information
All regular season home games, as well as all home and away playoff games air on AHL.TV, with Todd Crocker as the play-by-play announcer. Select games such as playoff games are also simulcast on The Sports Network.

Season-by-season results

Records as of the end of the 2021–22 season.

[1]-Indicates league leading: most shootout losses

[2]-Indicates league leading: fewest losses

[3]-Indicates league leading: fewest goals against

Players and personnel

Current roster
Updated March 18, 2023.

 

|}

Team captains

Marc Moro, 2005–2007
Ben Ondrus, 2007–2010
Alex Foster, 2010–11
Ryan Hamilton, 2011–2013
Trevor Smith, 2013–2015
Troy Bodie, 2015
Andrew Campbell, 2015–2017
Ben Smith, 2018
Rich Clune, 2021–2022
Logan Shaw, 2022–present

Head coaches

Paul Maurice, 2005–2006
Greg Gilbert, 2006–2009
Dallas Eakins, 2009–2013
Steve Spott, 2013–2014
Gord Dineen, 2014–2015
Sheldon Keefe, 2015–2019
Greg Moore, 2019–present

Team records

Single season
Goals: John Pohl, 36 (2005–06)
Assists: Jeremy Bracco, 57 (2018–19)
Points: Tim Stapleton, 79 (2008–09); Jeremy Bracco, 79 (2018–19)
Penalty minutes: Andre Deveaux, 216 (2009–10)
Point streak: Spencer Abbott, 13 (Oct. 6, 2013 – Nov. 16, 2013)
GAA: Garret Sparks, 1.79 (2017–18)
SV%: Garret Sparks, .936 (2017–18)
Wins: Garret Sparks, 31 (2017–18)
Shutouts: Garret Sparks, 6 (2017–18)

Career

Career goals: Ryan Hamilton, 94
Career assists: Mike Zigomanis, 116
Career points: Kris Newbury, 168
Career penalty Minutes: Kris Newbury, 475
Career goaltending wins: Garret Sparks, 80
Career shutouts: Garret Sparks, 15
Career games: Alex Foster, 312

Other records and firsts
First game: October 7, 2005. Rochester Americans 8, Marlies 5
First home game and first win: October 12, 2005. Marlies 5, Syracuse Crunch 2.
First goal: October 7, 2005. Rochester Americans 8, Marlies 5. Goal scored by Colin Murphy
First shutout: December 14, 2005. Jean-Sebastien Aubin. Marlies 5, Grand Rapids Griffins 0.
First hat trick: January 2, 2006. Luke Fulghum. Marlies 6, Cleveland Barons 1.
Most goals scored in a game: 10 (twice): February 8, 2009. Marlies 10, Grand Rapids Griffins 5. February 27, 2016. Marlies 10, Rochester Americans 5.

See also
List of ice hockey teams in Ontario

References

External links

 

 
Mar
Ice hockey clubs established in 2005
Maple Leaf Sports & Entertainment
Toronto Maple Leafs minor league affiliates
2005 establishments in Ontario